John Duncan Grimston, 7th Earl of Verulam (born 21 April 1951), styled Viscount Grimston between 1960 and 1973, is a British peer.

Early life
Grimston is the son of John Grimston, 6th Earl of Verulam. He succeeded in the earldom in 1973 on the death of his father.

Business career
For 14 years until 1996 he was a director of corporate finance at Barings Bank. He was a Managing Director of ABN-AMRO Bank from 1996 to 2000. He was a Director and Vice-Chairman of Kleinwort Benson Private Bank from 2001 to 2008. He is currently Chairman of Grimston Trust Ltd and founding partner of the Verulam Consulting group.

Grimston has founded two registered charities: The Friends of St Michael's Church, and The West Herts Environmental Foundation.

Personal life
Lord Verulam married Dione Smith in 1976. They have four children: James Grimston, Viscount Grimston and heir apparent, Hugo Guy Sylvester Grimston, Flora Grimston and Sam George Grimston.

Notes and references
Notes 
  
References

References 
Kidd, Charles, Williamson, David (editors). Debrett's Peerage and Baronetage (New York: St Martin's Press, 1990)

External links
Gorhambury Estate - Official Webpage

geni.com

1951 births
Living people
7
John
People educated at West Downs School

Verulam